Asterivora symbolaea is a species of moth in the family Choreutidae. It is endemic to New Zealand and has been observed in Arthur's Pass. This species lives in subalpine habitat. Adults of this is on the wing in January and February. Larvae are hosted by Celmisia prorepens.

Taxonomy 
This species was described by Edward Meyrick, using specimens collected at Arthur's Pass at 3000 to 3500 ft in January, and named Simaethis symbolaea. In 1927 Alfred Philpott studied the male genitalia of this species. In 1928 George Hudson discussed and illustrated this species under that name in his book The butterflies and moths of New Zealand. In 1979 J. S. Dugdale placed this species within the genus Asterivora. In 1988 Dugdale confirmed this placement. The male lectotype specimen, collected at Arthur's Pass, is held at the Natural History Museum, London.

Description 
This species was described by Meyrick as follows:

Distribution
This species is endemic to New Zealand and has been observed in Arthur's Pass.

Habitat 
This species lives in subalpine habitat.

Behaviour 
Adults of this species is on the wing in January and February.

Host species 

A host for the larvae of this moth is Celmisia prorepens. Moths have been raised from larvae obtained on this plant.

References

External links
Lectotype specimen image

Asterivora
Moths of New Zealand
Endemic fauna of New Zealand
Moths described in 1888
Taxa named by Edward Meyrick
Endemic moths of New Zealand